Charles Duane Baker III (born June 21, 1928) is an American businessman and government official. He served in several departmental roles in the Richard Nixon and Ronald Reagan administrations, including Under Secretary of Health and Human Services (1984–1985). He is the father of Massachusetts Governor Charlie Baker.

Life and career
Charles Duane Baker III was born in Newburyport, Massachusetts. He was the son of Charles D. Baker, Jr. (?–1971), a prominent Republican politician from Newburyport, Massachusetts, and Eleanor (Little) Baker. His grandfather was also named Charles D. Baker (1846–1934), and was a United States Attorney and member of the New York State Assembly. The young Baker had two sisters, Caroline R. Baker and Nancy B. Kobick. He attended Baldwin High School in Baldwin, New York, and graduated in 1945. He went on to attend Harvard College, and graduated in 1951 with an A.B. He spent 1946 to 1948 in the United States Navy in aviation, and returned from 1951 to 1953. In the Navy he achieved the rank of lieutenant (junior grade). He then returned to Harvard, receiving an M.B.A. from Harvard Business School in 1955.

He married Alice Elizabeth "Betty" Ghormley of Rochester, Minnesota on June 4, 1955. They moved to Elmira, New York, where he became a buyer for the Westinghouse Electric Corporation. They had three sons, Charles Duane Jr., Jonathan, and Alex. While at Westinghouse he moved to New Jersey in 1957. Baker moved back to Massachusetts to serve as vice president of United Research, an economic research firm, from 1961 to 1965.

In 1965 Baker became vice president of Harbridge House, a management consulting firm, part of whose client base included the United States Department of Defense, Department of Health and Human Services, and Department of Transportation. He was United States Deputy Under Secretary of Transportation (1969), Assistant Secretary of Transportation for Policy and International Affairs (1970–1971), and Under Secretary of Health and Human Services (1984–1985). In 1985 he became a professor at the Northeastern University College of Business Administration.

References

1928 births
Living people
Massachusetts Republicans
United States Department of Transportation officials
United States Department of Health and Human Services officials
Northeastern University faculty
People from Needham, Massachusetts
Politicians from Newburyport, Massachusetts
Politicians from Elmira, New York
Military personnel from Massachusetts
Harvard Business School alumni
Harvard College alumni